Biercée is a village of Wallonia and a district of the municipality of Thuin, located in the province of Hainaut, Belgium.

Notes

References

External links 
 

Former municipalities of Hainaut (province)
Thuin